Loose Fur is the first studio album by the rock band Loose Fur. It was released in 2003 on Drag City.

Track listing
All music by Loose Fur.
 "Laminated Cat" (lyrics by Jeff Tweedy) – 7:18
 "Elegant Transaction" (lyrics by Jim O'Rourke) – 6:15
 "So Long" (lyrics by O'Rourke) – 8:59
 "You Were Wrong" (lyrics by Tweedy) – 3:33
 "Liquidation Totale" (instrumental) – 5:37
 "Chinese Apple" (lyrics by Tweedy) – 7:34

Credits
Mixed by Jim O'Rourke.
Engineered by Jeremy Lemos and Kris Poulin.
Mastered by Konrad Strauss

Miscellanea
Cover art is from Brian Calvin's 1998 painting, California Free Form.
The album was recorded in 2000, but not released until early 2003.

References

2003 debut albums
Drag City (record label) albums
Loose Fur albums
Albums produced by Jim O'Rourke (musician)